The 62nd Neste Oil Rally Finland was the eighth round of the 2012 World Rally Championship season and was held between 2 and 4 August 2012. In a similar manner to the previous year, the rally was based in Jyväskylä with a super special stage held at Jokimaa, Lahti.

The rally was also the fifth round of the Super 2000 World Rally Championship and the third round of the WRC Academy.

Entry list

The entry list saw a total of 86 entries, 81 of which started.

 Note: The bolded entrants were eligible to score points for Manufactures' championship.

Report
Sébastien Loeb won the Rally Finland for the third time in his career. He led the rally from start to finish and was fastest in nine stages.

Results

Event standings

 Note:  – The WRC Academy featured all but the last stage of the rally, and therefore the academy drivers weren't able to finish the rally.

Special Stages

Power stage
The Power stage was a legendary Rally Finland stage, 33.01 km long Ouninpohja. The three fastest crews of this stage were awarded by drivers' championship points.

Championship standings after Rally Finland

Drivers' championship standings

Manufacturers' championship standings

SWRC Drivers' championship standings

WRC Academy Drivers' championship standings

 Note: Only the top five positions are included in all sets of standings.

References

External links

 Rally official website
 Rally Finland at WRC.com
 Rally Finland at eWRC.com
 Rally Finland at JUWRA.com

Finland
Rally Finland
Rally Finland